Danilin is a Russian surname that is derived from the male given name Danila and literally means Danila's. It may refer to:

 Maksim Danilin (footballer, born 1979), Russian football player
 Maksim Danilin (footballer, born May 2001), Russian football player with FC Dynamo Moscow
 Maksim Danilin (footballer, born September 2001), Russian football player with FC Spartak-2 Moscow
 Sergey Danilin (1901-1978), Soviet aviator
 Sergey Danilin (born 1960), Soviet luger
 Vyacheslav Danilin (born 1984), Russian footballer

Russian-language surnames